Yxygodes is a genus of snout moths from Madagascar.

Species
Some species of this genus are:
Yxygodes bekilalis (Marion, 1954)
Yxygodes insignis (Mabille, 1900)
Yxygodes meranalis (Viette, 1960)
Yxygodes olapalis (Viette, 1978)
Yxygodes seyrigalis (Marion, 1954)
Yxygodes vieualis (Viette, 1960)
Yxygodes xyridotalis (Viette, 1960)
Yxygodes zonalis (Mabille, 1900)

References

Snout moths of Africa
Pyralidae genera